Changes & Things is an album by bassist and cellist Sam Jones which was recorded in 1977 and released on the Xanadu label.

Reception

Scott Yanow of AllMusic states "Bassist Sam Jones' recordings as a leader have generally been underrated, but virtually every one is well-planned and recommended... The solos are colorful and purposeful, the material fairly diverse, and the results consistently swinging yet rarely predictable".

Track listing 
All compositions by Sam Jones except as indicated
 "Stablemates" (Benny Golson) - 6:59  
 "Miss Morgan" - 7:59  
 "Laverne Walk" (Oscar Pettiford) -  5:22  
 "Trane Changes" (Slide Hampton) - 7:29  
 "Sam's Things" - 5:57  
 "Blue's" (Blue Mitchell) - 7:58

Personnel 
Sam Jones - bass
Blue Mitchell - trumpet
Slide Hampton - trombone
Bob Berg - tenor saxophone
Barry Harris - piano
Louis Hayes - drums

References 

Sam Jones (musician) albums
1978 albums
Xanadu Records albums
Albums produced by Don Schlitten